The 1994 Mindoro earthquake occurred at  near Mindoro, Philippines. It had a moment magnitude of 7.1 and a maximum Rossi–Forel of VII (Very strong tremor). It is associated with a  ground rupture, called the Aglubang River fault.  Seventy eight people were reported dead, and 7,566 houses were damaged. The earthquake generated a tsunami and landslides on the Verde Island.

Earthquake
The epicenter of this earthquake was located in the Verde Island Passage, a strait separating Luzon and Mindoro. The focal mechanism showed predominantly right-lateral strike-slip faulting. The released seismic moment was about 5.12×1019 Nm.

Surface faulting

The Aglubang River fault, which shows a right-lateral strike-slip sense of movement, extends from Malaylay Island in the north of Oriental Mindoro to Alcate, Victoria in the south.

Tsunami

The earthquake generated a tsunami, which affected Mindoro, the Verde Island, the Baco Islands, and Luzon. Some concrete structures also suffered moderate damage in the tsunami. In Baco Islands, the vertical run-up reached . The tsunami was also recorded in Lobo. The tsunami was larger than expected considering the strike-slip movement of the earthquake.

See also
List of earthquakes in 1994
List of earthquakes in the Philippines

References

Further reading

External links 

1994 disasters in the Philippines
Earthquakes in the Philippines
1994 earthquakes
1994 tsunamis
History of Occidental Mindoro
History of Oriental Mindoro